The 2016–17 CERS Cup is the 37th season of the CERS Cup, Europe's second club roller hockey competition organized by CERH. Thirty teams from eight national associations qualified for the competition as a result of their respective national league placing in the previous season.
Barcelos won the title for the second consecutive season.

Teams 

Thirty teams from eight national associations qualified for the competition. League positions of the previous season shown in parentheses.

Preliminary phase 
The preliminary phase legs took place on 5 and 26 November 2016. Vilafranca and Barcelos received a bye and qualified directly for the round of 16.

|}

Knockout phase

Final-Four
All times are Western European Time.

Semi-finals

Final

References

External links
 CERH website
  Roller Hockey links worldwide
  Mundook-World Roller Hockey

World Skate Europe Cup
CERS Cup
CERS Cup